Orgasmic and Fuzati is a French duo project. Refer to

Orgasmic (producer)
Fuzati